Shield, in comics, may refer to:

 S.H.I.E.L.D., the Marvel Comics organization
 S.H.I.E.L.D. (comic book), a Marvel Comics ongoing series by Jonathan Hickman
 Shield (Archie Comics), a number of characters who appeared in Archie and Impact Comics publications
 The Shield: Spotlight, a comic book adaptation of the TV series and published by IDW Publishing

See also
Captain America's shield, the main weapon of Captain America
Blue Shield (comics), a Marvel Comics superhero
Deathshield, a Marvel Comics supervillain, trained by the Taskmaster to be the Captain America equivalent in an evil version of the Avengers
Eyeshield 21, a manga distributed in North America by Viz Comics
Heavenshield, an OEL manga from Tokyopop

References